Ricardo Relosa (born March 16, 1960), is a retired Filipino professional basketball player in the Philippine Basketball Association.

PBA career
As one of the four new acquisitions of Toyota Super Corollas in the 1982 PBA season, Ricky proved to be the most dependable and effective as a defensive player in two seasons with Toyota. He was among the seven Toyota players absorbed by newcomer Beer Hausen Brewmasters in 1984. after spending one season with Ginebra San Miguel the following year, Relosa was shipped to new team Alaska Milk in 1986.

He played four seasons with Alaska and in his first year, he was given the award as the Most Improved Player. Relosa earned the tag as one half of the vaunted "Bruise Brothers" with Yoyoy Villamin in his next three seasons with the Milkmen. In 1990, he was unprotected by the ballclub and was signed by expansion team Pepsi-Cola, the third new team he had joined in the last seven years. After a woeful stint with Pepsi, Relosa left for the United States and most thought he would migrate there for good. But Ricky soon found himself in the Shell roster midway in the 1991 PBA All-Filipino Conference.

In 1992, ten years after he won two championships with Toyota in his rookie year, Relosa became part of the champion team again with Shell winning the first conference crown. In his final PBA season, he triggered some sort of a "war" between the PBA and Games and Amusements Board (GAB) when he punched Swift import Ronnie Thompkins on the nape during the Shell-Swift encounter in the Commissioner's Cup. Relosa was suspended by then-commissioner Rey Marquez but the GAB decided to revoke his license, thus sparking a war of principles between the two bodies. Eventually, Relosa was allowed to play in the third conference after the Games and Amusements Board soften up on its stand.

References

External links
PBA's best of the decade: The 1980s

1960 births
Living people
Alaska Aces (PBA) players
Toyota Super Corollas players
Power forwards (basketball)
Centers (basketball)
Basketball players from Metro Manila
Sportspeople from Manila
Manila Beer Brewmasters players
Barangay Ginebra San Miguel players
TNT Tropang Giga players
Shell Turbo Chargers players